Ataxin 1 like is a protein that in humans is encoded by the ATXN1L gene.

References

Further reading